Aphra nyctemeroides is a moth of the subfamily Arctiinae. It was described by Francis Walker in 1869. It found in Brazil.

References

Moths described in 1869
Arctiinae
Moths of South America